Perrygrove railway station  is the home of the 15 in (381 mm) gauge Perrygrove Railway. The railway was opened in 1996 and is a heritage railway. There is a run round loop, sidings, platform, picnic area, station building, parking, and engine shed located at the station. Guided tours are available of the shed if staff are available.

References

External links
 Official Website

Forest of Dean
Heritage railway stations in Gloucestershire